All types of architectural projects in Scotland are eligible, including new-build, regeneration, restoration, extensions and interiors.

List of winners and nominees

2022

Shortlist 

 Forth Valley College – Falkirk Campus, Falkirk by Reiach and Hall Architects
 High Sunderland, Galashiels by Loader Monteith
 Jedburgh Grammar Campus, Jedburgh by Stallan-Brand Architecture + Design
 Lockerbie Sawmill, Lockerbie by Konishi Gaffney
 Quarry Studios, Aberdeenshire by Moxon Architects

2021

Winner 

 Aberdeen Art Gallery - Hoskins Architects

Shortlist 

 Bayes Centre, Edinburgh by Bennetts Associates
 The Egg Shed, Ardrishaig by Oliver Chapman Architects
 The Hill House Box, Helensburgh by Carmody Groarke
 sportscotland National Sports Training Centre Inverclyde by Reiach and Hall Architects

2019
Rogers Stirk Harbour + Partners: The Macallan Distillery and Visitor Experience

2018
Reiach & Hall Architects: Nucleus, The Nuclear Decommissioning Authority and Caithness Archive, Wick

2017
Richard Murphy Architects: Dunfermline Carnegie Library & Galleries for Fife Council

2016
Page\Park Architects: Saunders Centre, Science & Technology Building, Glasgow

2015
 Sutherland Hussey Harris: West Burn Lane, St Andrews
 Malcolm Fraser: Arcadia Nursery, Edinburgh
 Page\Park Architects: Theatre Royal, Glasgow, new foyers

2014
 Morgan McDonnell Architecture Ltd: Advocates Close, Edinburgh - winner
 Robin Baker Architects: The Birks Cinema, Aberfeldy - special mention
 Denizen Works Ltd: House No. 7, Isle of Tiree - special mention
 GLM: The Inn at John O’Groats, Caithness - special mention
 Reiach & Hall Architects: Scottish Water – The Bridge, Stepps - special mention
 Elder and Cannon Architects: 261 West Princes Street, Glasgow
 BDP: Buchanan Gardens, Glasgow
 Dualchas Architects: Cliff House, Isle of Skye
 Elder and Cannon Architects: Clydebank East Workshops, Clydebank
 RMJM Architecture Ltd: Commonwealth Games Athletes’ Village, Glasgow
 Gareth Hoskins Architects: Grassmarket Community Project, Edinburgh
 LDN Architects: Knockando Woolmill, Knockando 
 Foster + Partners: The SSE Hydro, Glasgow

2013
 NORD Architecture: WASPS South Block, Glasgow - winner
 Simpson & Brown Architects: The Chapel of Saint Albert the Great, Edinburgh - special mention
 Reiach and Hall Architects: Forth Valley College of Further and Higher Education, Stirling Campus, Stirling - special mention
 Edo Architecture: The Ghost of Water Row (Temporary Structure), Govan, Glasgow - special mention
 schmidt hammer lassen architects: Sir Duncan Rice Library, Aberdeen - special mention
 Patience & Highmore: Thomas Telford Parliamentary Church, Berneray, North Uist - special mention
 LDN Architects: The Beacon Arts Centre, Greenock
 Fife Council Property Services: Dunfermline High School, Dunfermline
 cameronwebster architects: House, Lenzie
 studioKAP: 4 Linsiadar, Isle of Lewis
 Gareth Hoskins Architects: Mareel, Lerwick
 Rural Design: The Turf House, Isle of Skye

2012
 OMA: Maggie's Gartnavel, Glasgow - winner
 G1 Group: Corinthian Club, Glasgow - special mention
 Holmes Miller: Heathfield Primary School, Ayr - special mention
 Dualchas Building Design: House at Borreraig, Isle of Skye - special mention
 Page\Park Architects: Scottish National Portrait Gallery, Edinburgh - special mention
 Rural Design: Bogbain Mill, Lochussie
 Cameron Webster Architects: Cape Cove, Shore Road, Helensburgh
 Hypostyle Architects: Fore Street, Glasgow
 Reiach and Hall Architects: Forth Valley College of Further and Higher Education, Alloa Campus, Alloa
 LDN Architects LLP: Heriot's Centre for Sport & Exercise, Edinburgh
 Icosis Architects: Loch Leven Bird Hide, Fife
 Gokay Deveci Chartered Architects: Model 'D' House, Insch
 McGregor Bowes + Haworth Tompkins: The Scotsman Steps, Edinburgh
 Zone Architects: Wester Coates House, Edinburgh

2011
 Gareth Hoskins Architects: The National Museum of Scotland, Edinburgh - winner
 Austin-Smith:Lord LLP: 10 Pearce Street, Govan, Glasgow - special mention
 Richard Gibson Architects: Groedians, Lerwick - special mention
 Nicoll Russell Studios: Hillcrest Housing Association Headquarters, Dundee - special mention
 jmarchitects Ltd: Hillhead Primary School, Glasgow - special mention
 Simon Winstanley Architects Ltd: The Houl, Castle Douglas - special mention
 Malcolm Fraser Architects: Linlithgow Burgh Halls, Linlithgow - special mention
 7N Architects: Phoenix Flowers, Glasgow - special mention
 SBA Architects Ltd: The Brochs of Coigach, Achiltibuie
 Page\Park Architects: Centre for the Scottish War Blinded, Kirknewton
 Reiach and Hall Architects: Dundee House, Dundee
 Gaia Architects: Glentress Peel Visitor Centre, Peebles
 LDN Architects: University of Edinburgh Business School, Edinburgh

2010
 Elder and Cannon Architects: Shettleston Housing Association Offices, Glasgow - winner
 Page\Park Architects: McManus Galleries, Dundee - special mention
 Rural Design: 15 Fiscavaig, Isle of Skye
 Nicoll Russell Studios: The Briggait Redevelopment, Glasgow
 The Pollock Hammond Partnership: The Hippodrome Cinema, Bo'ness
 Paterson Architects: House on a Hill, Aberdeenshire
 Edward Culling Architects: John Hope Gateway, Edinburgh
 Reaich and Hall Architects: Medical & Biological Sciences Building, University of St Andrews
 Dualchas Building Design: Raasay Community Hall, Isle of Raasay
 Gokay Deveci Chartered Architect: Tigh Na Cladach, Dunoon
 Anderson Bell + Christie: The West Centre, Glasgow

2009
 Archial Architects: Small Animal Hospital, Glasgow - winner
 McKenzie Strickland Associates: Boathouse at Balnearn
 Allan Murray Architects: Hotel Missoni, Edinburgh
 Malcolm Fraser Architects: Infirmary Street Baths, Edinburgh
 Reiach and Hall Architects: New Stobhill Hospital, Glasgow
 Elder and Cannon Architects: Niddrie Mill and St Francis Join Primary School, Edinburgh
 RMJM Scotland Ltd: North Glasgow College, Glasgow
 Richard Murphy Architects, Elder and Cannon Architects, Page\Park Architects: Social Housing at Moore Street, Glasgow
 Cameron Webster Architects: The Printworks, Glasgow
 Elder and Cannon Architects: Trongate 103, Glasgow

2008
Bennetts Associates: Potterrow, Edinburgh - joint winner
Elder & Cannon Architects: Castlemilk House Stables Block, Glasgow- joint winner
Gareth Hoskins Architects Ltd: Culloden Battlefield Visitor Centre, Inverness - special mention
Studio KAP: Tigh Na Dobhran (single-family dwelling), Argyll
Simpson & Brown Architects: Dawyck Gateway Visitor Centre, Dawyck
Oliver Chapman Architects: Todlaw Supported Housing, Duns
Foster + Partners: Quartermile Development, Edinburgh
Gordon Murray & Alan Dunlop Architects Architects: Telford Drive (housing development), Edinburgh
Elder & Cannon Architects: Jordanhill School New Teaching Block, Glasgow
Gray Marshall & Associates Heart of Hawick, Hawick
Page\Park Architects: Eden Court Theatre (refurbishment), Inverness

2007
 Reiach & Hall Architects: Pier Arts Centre, Orkney - winner
Gareth Hoskins Architects: Bridge Arts Centre, Glasgow
Page\Park Architects: Fettes College Sixth Form Building, Edinburgh
Gordon Murray & Alan Dunlop Architects: Hazelwood School, Glasgow
Zaha Hadid Architects: Maggie's Centre, Kirkcaldy
Malcolm Fraser Architects: Princess Gate, Edinburgh
Reiach & Hall Architects: University of St Andrews Arts Faculty building, St Andrews

2006
 Page\Park Architects: Maggie's Centre, Inverness - winner
Malcolm Fraser Architects:  Scottish Storytelling Centre, Edinburgh
Building Design Partnership: Perth Concert Hall, Perth
LDN Architects: St Mary's Metropolitan Cathedral redevelopment, Edinburgh
Gareth Hoskins Architects: The Bridge Arts Centre, Easterhouse, Glasgow
Gordon Murray & Alan Dunlop Architects: JKS Workshops, Clydebank
Building Design Partnership: The Saltire Centre, Glasgow Caledonian University, Glasgow
Building Design Partnership: Kelvingrove New Century Project, Glasgow
Paterson Architects: Three Seton Mains, Longniddry
Michael Laird Architects: Royal Bank of Scotland Headquarters, Gogarburn, Edinburgh

2005
 Enric Miralles/RMJM: Scottish Parliament building, Edinburgh - winner
Gökay Deveci: A' Chrannag, Rothesay
Gareth Hoskins Architects: Community Centre for Health, Partick, Glasgow
Michael Laird Architects: Edinburgh Quay, Union canal, Edinburgh
Gordon Murray & Alan Dunlop Architects: Sentinel Office Development, Glasgow

2004
Elder and Cannon Architects:  St Aloysius College's Clavius Building, Glasgow - winner
Frank Gehry: Maggie's Centre, Dundee
Richard Murphy: Eastgate Theatre and Arts Centre, Peebles
Gökay Deveci: Lotte Glob House, Durness, Sutherland

2003
Sutherland Hussey Architects:  "An Turas" Ferry Shelter, Tiree - winner
Reiach and Hall Architects: Evolution House, Edinburgh
Arcade Architects: Mossman Houses, Edinburgh
LDN Architects: Kilncraigs Mill Redevelopment, Alloa
Gordon Murray & Alan Dunlop Architects: Radisson SAS Hotel, Glasgow

2002
Malcolm Fraser Architects: Dance Base, Edinburgh - winner
Richard Murphy: Stirling Tolbooth, Stirling
Munkenbeck & Marshall: Mount Stuart visitor centre, Bute
Nicoll Russell Studios: New Byre Theatre, St Andrews
McKeown Alexander Architects: Graham Square housing, Glasgow

References

RIAS
Architecture awards
Architecture in Scotland
Scottish awards
Awards established in 2002